Dragana Marinković (born 19 October 1982) is a Serbian professional volleyball player who competed for the Croatian and Serbian women's national teams in the 2000s. Marinković has played for seven seasons in the Italian Serie A. In the season 2009/2010, she moved to Pesaro.

Sources

External links
Dragana Marinkovic at the International Volleyball Federation
 
 

1982 births
Living people
Serbian women's volleyball players
Croatian women's volleyball players
Sportspeople from Pula
Serbs of Croatia
Expatriate volleyball players in Italy
Expatriate volleyball players in Romania
Expatriate volleyball players in Turkey
Expatriate volleyball players in South Korea
Serbian expatriate sportspeople in Italy
Serbian expatriate sportspeople in Romania
Serbian expatriate sportspeople in Turkey
Serbian expatriate sportspeople in South Korea